Tim Moore (born July 25, 1966, in Paducah, Kentucky) is an American politician and a Republican member of the Kentucky House of Representatives representing District 26 since January 2007.

Education
Moore earned his BS in engineering mechanics from the United States Air Force Academy and his MS in operations management from the University of Arkansas.

Elections
2012 Moore was unopposed for both the May 22, 2012 Republican Primary, and the November 6, 2012 General election, winning with 11,179 votes.
2006 When District 26 Democratic Representative Mike Weaver left the Legislature and left the seat open, Moore won the 2006 Republican Primary with 1,233 votes (75.6%) and won the November 7, 2006 General election with 4,949 votes (53.0%) against Democratic nominee Jerry Brown.
2008 Moore and former Democratic Representative Weaver were both unopposed for their 2008 primaries, but had not been election opponents before; Moore won the November 4, 2008 General election with 7,659 votes (50.4%) against former Representative Moore.
2010 Moore was unopposed for the May 18, 2010 Republican Primary and won the November 2, 2010 General election with 6,782 votes (65.8%) against Democratic nominee Allan Francis.
2018 Moore's faced first-time runner, Donielle Lovell.  Moore won the November 6, 2018 general election with 10,110 votes (nearly 69%) against Lovell.

References

External links
Official page at the Kentucky General Assembly

Tim Moore at Ballotpedia
Tim Moore at the National Institute on Money in State Politics

1966 births
Living people
Republican Party members of the Kentucky House of Representatives
People from Elizabethtown, Kentucky
People from Paducah, Kentucky
United States Air Force Academy alumni
United States Air Force officers
Military personnel from Arkansas
University of Arkansas alumni
21st-century American politicians